Wormald Green is a village in the civil parish of Markington with Wallerthwaite in the district of Harrogate, North Yorkshire. In 2016, Harrogate Borough Council (HBC) estimated the population of the village to be 136. It is situated on the A61 road between Harrogate and Ripon which crosses over Markington Beck here.

From 1848 to 1964 it was served by Wormald Green railway station on the Leeds–Northallerton Railway, though passenger services ceased already in 1962. There is a regular bus service provided by Harrogate Bus (route 36) along the A61 road linking Leeds with Ripon via Harrogate and serving Wormald Green. Buses ply the route on average of three per hour (every 20 minutes) rising to four per hour between 11:00 am and 16:00 pm. There is a hotel east of the bridge across the stream.

References

External links
Images of Wormald Green from Historic Markington

Villages in North Yorkshire
Borough of Harrogate